The modern division of philosophy into theoretical philosophy and practical philosophy has its origin in Aristotle's categories of natural philosophy and moral philosophy. The one has theory for its object, and the other practice.
__forcetoc__

Overview
In Denmark, Finland, Germany, Netherlands, Sweden, and United States courses in theoretical and practical philosophy are taught separately, and are separate degrees. Other countries may use a similar scheme—some Scottish universities, for example, divide philosophy into logic, metaphysics, and ethics—but in most universities around the world philosophy is taught as a single subject. There is also a unified philosophy subject in some Swedish universities, such as Södertörns Högskola.

Theoretical philosophy is sometimes confused with analytic philosophy, but the latter is a philosophical movement, embracing certain ideas and methods but dealing with all philosophical subject matters, while the former is a way of sorting philosophical questions into two different categories in the context of a curriculum.

Subjects of theoretical philosophy
Epistemology
Logic
Philosophy of mathematics
Philosophy of science
Philosophy of language
Philosophy of mind
Metaphysics
Ontology

References